"Truly Yours" is a 1966 song and single by the Spinners for the Motown label. Co-written and produced by William "Mickey" Stevenson and Ivy Jo Hunter, the single became the Detroit-reared group's second to chart on the company label, and the fourth to chart altogether. It was also the last to chart in the 1960s and last to chart for the group until "It's a Shame". The single peaked at 11 on the Billboard Bubbling Under Hot 100 chart. On the Billboard R&B singles chart, "Truly Yours" peaked at number 16.

During this period, as Motown treated the group as a second-tier signing, the label released one single a year from 1964 to 1969. Thus commercial success would elude the group until 1970.

The song was covered in 1967 by the Temptations and Hunter himself. The Temptations version was unreleased until 1986, while Hunter's version, backed by the Temptations, wouldn't be released until January 12, 2005.

Personnel

The Spinners version
Lead vocals by Bobby Smith
Background vocals by Bobby Smith, Chico Edwards, Pervis Jackson, Henry Fambrough and Billy Henderson
Additional background vocals by the Andantes
Instrumentation by the Funk Brothers

The Temptations version
Lead vocals by David Ruffin
Background vocals by Eddie Kendricks, Melvin Franklin, Paul Williams, and Otis Williams
Instrumentation by the Funk Brothers.

Ivy Jo Hunter version
 Lead vocals by Ivy Jo Hunter
 Background vocals by the Temptations: Eddie Kendricks, Melvin Franklin, Paul Williams, David Ruffin, and Otis Williams
 Instrumentation by the Funk Brothers.

Charts

References

External sites

1966 singles
1966 songs
The Spinners (American group) songs
The Temptations songs
Songs written by William "Mickey" Stevenson
Songs written by Ivy Jo Hunter
Song recordings produced by William "Mickey" Stevenson
Song recordings produced by Ivy Jo Hunter
Motown singles